Chase a Crooked Shadow ( Sleep No More) is a 1958 British suspense film starring Richard Todd, Anne Baxter and Herbert Lom. Michael Anderson directed Chase a Crooked Shadow, the first film produced by Associated Dragon Films, a business venture of Douglas Fairbanks Jr.

Plot
In her family's Spanish villa, Kimberly Prescott (Baxter), a young South African heiress of a diamond company, is grieving after her father's recent suicide, when she is taken aback by the arrival of a man (Todd) claiming to be her brother Ward, believed to have died in a car accident a few months ago. Kimberly calls the police but the man has a driving licence, passport and letter from the bank in the name of Ward Prescott. Even two photos from upstairs look like the man now in her house. The local police chief, Vargas, leaves, believing Kim to be unstable.

The next day Kim is woken by an unknown woman who says she is Mrs Whitman, a friend of Ward's. Kim's maid has been given time off. A butler has also been installed in the house. Kim attempts to contact Uncle Chan who knows both her and the real Ward, but when Chan finally shows up he greets the imposter as if he were the real Ward. Kim suspects the imposter may be after her inheritance and later in the plot, he and Mrs Whitman try to get Kim to sign a will. However, there is also a conversation whereby "Ward" says he suspects Kim of having stolen diamonds from their late father's company's vault. He has a record of flights she took that leave a gap in her itinerary. Eventually Kim admits she took the diamonds to Tangiers. "Ward" and Mrs Whitman then get her to sign an introduction for "Ward" as her agent to the bank in Tangiers.

Kim tries to escape to the beach house below the main villa. Someone has followed her and she almost shoots him with a spear gun. It is Vargas. She shows him the will and he starts to believe her story. He suggests she provide him with something holding "Ward"'s fingerprints as he cannot fake these. She is able to do this after meeting "Ward" on the terrace. They drink brandy and flirt until "Ward" is on the phone and Mrs Whitman has gone upstairs. Kim goes to the beach house and takes a metal box from the chimney. She sneaks back up to the villa and tries to leave through the front door. Uncle Chan blocks her path.

Her captors take her to the terrace and open the box. With the diamonds on the table they demand she sign the will. Then 'Ward' suggests they go for a swim. Mrs Whitman suggests they take a boat. Kim assumes they plan to drown her and runs into the house. Then Vargas arrives. She begs him to save her as the others have threatened to drown her. She thinks he will reveal the man to be an imposter but he says the fingerprints are a match for her brother. At this point Kim has a meltdown and starts saying that her brother has to be dead "because I killed him". She says she cut the brakes on his car and followed, to see him drive to his death off a cliff. Once she has made this confession it is revealed that "Ward" and Mrs Whitman were undercover police sent to find the missing diamonds and discover the truth behind the real Ward's death.

Cast

 Richard Todd as Ward McKenzie Prescott Jr.
 Anne Baxter as Kimberley Prescott
 Herbert Lom as Inspector Vargas
 Faith Brook as Elaine Whitman
 Alexander Knox as Chandler Bridson
 Alan Tilvern as Carlos
 Thelma D'Aguilar as Maria

Production
The film was originally known as The Prescott Affair. The story was optioned by Dragon Films which belonged to the team of heiress Pamela Woolworth (niece of F.W. Woolworth) and Douglas Fairbanks Jr. who had made The Silken Affair. Dragon developed the story and script, assigning it to two TV writers David Osborn and Charles Sinclair. Roy Kellino originally was attached to produce and direct. David Niven was the first male star announced.

Dragon obtained finance from the Associated British Picture Corporation (ABPC) who had a releasing arrangement with Warner Bros. The production company became known as Associated Dragon. ABPC's involvement saw director Michael Anderson and star Richard Todd come on to the project. The title was changed to Sleep No More, then Chase a Crooked Shadow and filming started in May 1957. Fairbanks Jr. said he was pressured to make a cameo in the film but refused. Some of the exteriors were shot in Tamariu and Palamos on the Costa Brava. The guitar music that forms a significant part of the soundtrack is played by Julian Bream.

Reception
Chase a Crooked Shadow received mixed reviews. Bosley Crowther in his review for The New York Times considered the plot as overly complex and torturous but that the melodrama was "nothing amazing, and neither is this film. It's just a moderately well-done program picture, endowed with a couple of standard thrills".Leonard Maltin awarded the film three out of four stars, calling it an "exciting, Hitchcock-like melodrama".

RemakesChase a Crooked Shadow was remade in India a few times, as the Bengali-language film Sesh Anka (1963), the Tamil-language film Puthiya Paravai (1964), the Hindi-language film Dhuan (1981), and the Malayalam-language films 'Rahasyam,' Prem Naseer starrer, 'Ithile Vannavar' of Madhu and Charithram (1989)

The earlier two Indian films later served as an inspiration for the French play Piège pour un homme seul (Trap for a Lonely Man) by Robert Thomas. The play served as the source material for various television films such as Honeymoon with a Stranger and One of My Wives Is Missing that originally aired on ABC Movie of the Week, as well as Vanishing Act that originally aired on CBS. The 2019 Malaysian film Misteri Dilaila is also loosely based on these films. The movie was also an inspiration for the 1989 Hindi move Khoj which was remade in Telugu as Police Report and in Kannada as Agni Sakshi.

A stage adaptation of the original British film, called Double Cut and written by Alfred Shaughnessy, was first staged at the Thorndike Theatre, Leatherhead in 1984, with Simon Williams and Lucy Fleming in the leads, prior to touring the UK the following year with David Griffin and Tessa Wyatt.

References

Notes

Bibliography

 Bawden, James and Ron Miller.  Conversations with Classic Film Stars: Interviews from Hollywood's Golden Era''. Lexington, Kentucky: University Press of Kentucky, 2016. .

External links
 
 
 
 
 

1958 films
1950s mystery films
1950s English-language films
British black-and-white films
British mystery thriller films
Films shot at Associated British Studios
Films directed by Michael Anderson
Films set in Spain
Films shot in Barcelona
1950s British films